Fonteyn is a Dutch surname. Notable people with the surname include:

 Carel Fonteyn (fl. 1655–1665), Flemish painter
 Margot Fonteyn (1919–1991), English ballerina
 Mathieu Fonteyn (born 1985), Belgian swimmer
 Sam Fonteyn (1925–1991), English composer and pianist

See also
Fonteyn (crater), a crater on mercury

Dutch-language surnames